The AFFA Amateur League is run by the Association of Football Federations of Azerbaijan (AFFA).

AFFA Amateur League is amateur and professional teams compete in the league. They are divided into 2 groups and hold 18 rounds.8 teams, who are in the top four in the group, advance to the quarterfinals.

Champions

References

External links
  AFFA
  AFFA
  PFL

Football leagues in Azerbaijan
Fourth level football leagues in Europe